Diyab Simon Dabschah (born 13 March 1991) is a German professional boxer.

Professional boxing record

References

External links
 

1991 births
Living people
German male boxers
Light-heavyweight boxers
People from Landau
Sportspeople from Rhineland-Palatinate